Gelato is the fifteenth mixtape by American rapper Young Dolph. The mixtape was released on February 2, 2017, by Paper Route Empire. The mixtape features guest appearances from Wiz Khalifa, Migos and Lil Yachty. Meanwhile, the production includes Zaytoven, Izze The Producer and Drumma Boy, among others. It was supported by one single, "Bagg".

Singles
The lead single for the album, "Bagg" was released on January 4, 2017.

Track listing

Charts

References

2017 mixtape albums
Young Dolph albums
Empire Distribution albums
Albums produced by TM88
Albums produced by Zaytoven
Albums produced by Drumma Boy